The Adan River is a river in Washim District, Maharashtra, India and a principal tributary of the Painganga River.

Geography
The source of the Adan River is in the Washim district of Maharashtra. The Arunavati River meets the Adan River about 13 kilometres before it joins the Painganga River. The river dries up in the summer, leaving only pools towards the end of its course.

Two dams have been built on the Adan; one at its origin near Sonala village and the other near Karanja Lad city, both in Washim District. The river then flows shrubland.

Adan Dam was built in 1977 near Karanja Lad, Washim district around 13 km from where the Adan River meets the Painanga.

Environmental Impact of the Adan Dam 
In two separate reports on the environmental impact of the Adan Dam on the aquatic biodiversity of the river and the surrounding fishing communities in 2008 and 2012, Dr Nilesh K. Heda reported the following effects:
 Effect on Fishing Communities: The new reservoir has led to large areas of the river becoming inaccessible to local anglers who cannot fish for most of the year due to the low water level. The construction of the dam has led to high levels of siltation and hydrophyte growth. These changes have led to the local Bhoi people having to rely less on their more sustainable, traditional fishing techniques.
 Effect on Aquatic Ecosystem: The diversity and abundance of fish has declined since the construction of the dam. Some species of fish have been completely wiped out from the area of the river about the dam (namely eutropiichthys vacha, anguilla bengalensis bengalensis, barilius species, tor khudree, tor mussullah, and gonoproktopterus kolus). Heda reports that local elders noticed that, as well as fish species, otters and tortoises had also been wiped out.

Fish of Adan River
The following species were found to be present in the Adan river by Dr Nilesh Heda:

 Acanthocobitis moreh 
 Amblypharyngodon mola
 Anguilla bengalensis bengalensis 
 Barilius bendelisis
 Other barilius species
 Chanda nama 
 Channa orientalis 
 Channa punctatus 
 Channa striatus 
 Cirrhinus fulungee 
 Danio aequipinnatus 
 Other danio species 
 Garra mullya
 Glossogobius giuris 
 Gonoproktopterus kolus
 Labeo rohita 
 Lepidocephalus thermalis 
 Macrognathus aral 
 Mastacembelus armatus 
 Mystus bleekeri 
 Mystus cavasius 
 Other mystus species
 Nemacheilus species
 Notopterus notopterus
 Ompok bimaculatus 
 Oreochromis mossambica 
 Oreonectes evezardi
 Osteobrama cotio peninsularis 
 Osteobrama vigorsii 
 Parambassis ranga 
 Puntius amphibius 
 Puntius sarana sarana
 Puntius sophore 
 Other puntius species
 Puntius ticto 
 Rasbora daniconius 
 Rita species 
 Salmostoma horai 
 Salmostoma novacula 
 Schistura denisoni denisoni 
 Thynnichthys sandkhol 
 Tor khudree 
 Tor mussulah 
 Tor tor 
 Wallago attu 
 Xenentodon cancila

Local People
The local Bhoi people live in fishing communities on the banks of the river. The Bhoi are traditionally dependent upon the Adan for food and so their traditional way of life is at risk due to depleting fish resources.

See also

List of rivers of India
Rivers of India

References

Fishing communities in India
Rivers of Maharashtra
Tributaries of the Godavari River
Rivers of India